Halwill is a village in Devon, England just off the A3079 Okehampton to Holsworthy road. About a mile away on the main road is another settlement called Halwill Junction.

This name brings to mind the former significance of the two villages, as home to an important railway junction, where the North Cornwall Railway (forming part of a main line railway from Exeter to Plymouth) diverged from the earlier Okehampton to Bude Line, see Halwill Junction railway station. Portions for the two routes separated and rejoined at Halwill station, giving the villages a much better service than larger habitations in the area.

There is a football pitch in Halwill as well as a newsagents, Fish and Chip shop and other shops. The local football team play on the football pitch.

Notable people
William Stanlake, recipient of the Victoria Cross

External links

Villages in Devon